, also known as UTY, is a Japanese broadcast network affiliated with the JNN. Its headquarters are located in Kōfu, Yamanashi.

History
Television Yamanashi was established on 1 April 1970 as the second broadcasting station located in Yamanashi Prefecture. A new studio and head office was completed on 1 August 1984. Digital terrestrial television broadcasts started in July 2006. All analog broadcasting were discontinued on 24 July 2011.

Stations

Digital(ID:6)
Kofu(Main Station) JOGI-DTV 27 ch
Fujiyosihda 27 ch
Otsuki 19 ch
Otsuki-Hatsukari 40ch
Tsuru 37 ch
Uenohara 34 ch
Nambu 44 ch
Minobu 24 ch
Nirazaki-Anayama 42 ch

Programs
UTY News no hoshi(UTYニュースの星) - from 18:16 until 18:55 on Weekdays

Rival Stations
Yamanashi Broadcasting System(YBS)

Other Links
Welcome to UTY

Japan News Network
Television stations in Japan
Mass media in Kōfu, Yamanashi
Companies based in Yamanashi Prefecture
Television channels and stations established in 1970